Puma is a character appearing in American comic books published by Marvel Comics. Created by Tom DeFalco and Ron Frenz, he first appeared in The Amazing Spider-Man #256 (September 1984), as an adversary of the superhero Spider-Man. Despite this, the character does not lack morals or a sense of justice, and eventually turned his life around, becoming a recurring ally of Spider-Man instead, whom he came to respect. Puma is the alter ego of Thomas Fireheart, a Native American who was bred to be a perfect warrior prophesied to stop a future threat that might destroy the world, gaining the ability to transform into a humanoid mountain lion werecat at will. He later became a businessman and the CEO of Fireheart Enterprises, as well as a mercenary.

Publication history
Puma first appeared in The Amazing Spider-Man #256 and was created by Tom DeFalco and Ron Frenz. The inspiration for the character comes from safari cards bought by Tom DeFalco.

In the Puma's earliest appearances, he acted as a mercenary, and an antagonist to Spider-Man, but soon came to respect him. Puma was then depicted as an ally of Spider-Man, assisting him on several occasions during The Spectacular Spider-Man series. He was associated with the superhero team known as the Outlaws for a time, and was later one of the main characters in the MODOK's 11 limited series.

Fictional character biography
Thomas Fireheart is of Native American descent and belongs to a tribe (located near Hartsdale, New Mexico; Marvel Westerns: Western Legends suggests that the tribe may be the Kisani, as one of Puma's ancestors belonged to that tribe and lived at Lost Mesa) with an ancient prophecy of the coming of a powerful being who might destroy the world for generations. Long ago, they began making preparations for this coming doom. They used mystic ceremonies and selective breeding to create a perfect warrior. Thomas Fireheart is the latest in this line of men. Though he never believed in the prophecy, he took his duties as protector of his tribe seriously, and has strived his whole life to be the best he could be, mastering his ability to turn into a powerful humanoid mountain lion werecat. He also trained in Martial Arts in Japan under a man named Master Muramoto.

Very intelligent, and with a good business sense, he became owner and CEO of Fireheart Enterprises. Headquartered near his tribe in Hartsdale, Arizona, it is a multinational corporation involved in many different endeavors, with regional offices around the world. Becoming bored with corporate life, he began to seek greater challenges, and offered his skills as Puma for sale.

He is operating as a mercenary and is hired by the Rose to kill Spider-Man, but is thwarted by the Black Cat. He again attempts to attack Spider-Man, but changes his mind and departs when he witnesses Spider-Man saving innocent bystanders.

During the Secret Wars II storyline, Puma later confronted the Beyonder in New York; however, the Beyonder simply transported him to downtown Tokyo. Puma became enraged at the death of Master Muramoto as the inadvertent result of the Beyonder's actions. Puma reached a state of "harmonious enlightenment with the universe" and was imbued with immeasurable power. However, doubting his own senses, Puma lost the mystical power just as he attacked the Beyonder. Puma was able to learn Spider-Man's secret identity, Peter Parker, thanks to his enhanced senses, and now felt he owed him a debt of honor as a result of the Beyonder affair. He offered Peter Parker a job at his company while Peter was on his honeymoon in France; however, Peter declined the offer. Puma later attempted to clear Spider-Man's name of a crime he didn't commit, and first encountered Silver Sable and The Outlaws.

When the mutant powers of Charles Little Sky, a kinsman of Fireheart's (and the man later known as Portal), first manifested, Fireheart tried to help his fellow tribesman better understand his powers. Rejecting Fireheart's offers of aid, Portal fled to Ellis Island where Fireheart caught up to him. When Portal's powers activated again and returned the U-Foes to Earth, Fireheart was forced to team up with the Avengers as Puma to protect Little Sky, helping to defeat the villains.

Puma then battled Spider-Man in New York. Fireheart actually purchased 51% of the Daily Bugle, made Robbie Robertson publisher, and began a pro-Spider-Man campaign in the publication, in an attempt to pay off his debt of honor. During this time, he was nearly killed in an attack by the Hobgoblin, but was saved by Spider-Man.

Fireheart agreed to join Spider-Man's rag-tag superhero group called the Outlaws, along with several other Spider-Man adversaries-turn-allies (including Sandman, Rocket Racer, and the Prowler). The group clashed with the Avengers, until it was revealed that both groups were actually being manipulated by the shape-changing Space Phantom, whom Thomas exposed and defeated.

He eventually sold the Daily Bugle back to J. Jonah Jameson for $1, and he and Spider-Man settled their debt of honor on a vision quest in New Mexico.

Fireheart's Puma persona later consumed him, and he attempted to assassinate a US Senator. Spider-Man stopped him, but not before the NYPD shot Fireheart several times. The Black Crow cast a magical spell removing all knowledge of Spider-Man's secret identity from Fireheart's mind. He was nursed back to mental and physical health by another character named Nocturne (not the Exiles character Nocturne).

Puma was seen in the Bloodsport competition. He made it to the semi-final round, but was defeated by Wolverine.

He was next seen teaming up with Spider-Man and the Black Cat to stop Stegron from "de-evolving" the population of New York. After this Puma began a relationship with the Black Cat (as shown they were both in bed) although he notices Felicia may still have feelings for Peter Parker.

After the events of Civil War, he was seen helping Spider-Man escort Prowler out of the Bar With No Name. He has also been seen helping Black Cat from the sidelines. She has decided to help Peter Parker, who is on the run after the events of the Civil War. Together, Puma and Black Cat neutralize the drunken rampage of the Rhino, mostly through sheer bluffing. Puma also attended training at Camp Hammond.

Fireheart was then accused of federal bribery (which so far appears to be a frame job) and his assets frozen; forbidden by his tribe from taking any contract kills, he has joined MODOK's 11 to get the cash he needs to defend himself in court. However, this meant disobeying the tribal council's order to remain on the reservation and so he's had his puma powers stripped from him, leaving him a regular human right in the middle of the mission. When deciding to rescue the Living Laser, who had earlier saved his life, he had an epiphany that defending one's own people is what the Puma Totem is meant to do, and he regained his powers in the process. Or so he thinks — actually Deadly Nightshade had secretly injected him with "werewolf serum". Puma has gained his cash from MODOK and has taken up an offer from Nightshade to help his legal defense; any long-term effects from the serum are unknown.

During the Secret Empire storyline, Puma is seen as a member of the Underground when Hydra took over the United States.

In a prelude to the Hunted storyline, Puma is among the animal-themed characters captured by Taskmaster and Black Ant for Kraven the Hunter's upcoming Great Hunt. Puma was seen watching the fight between Spider-Man and Scorpion until the Hunter-Bots arrive. Puma was seen fleeing the Hunter-Bots. When Vulture gathers the other animal-themed villains together, Puma was present when Spider-Man mentions the loss of Gibbon and Mandrill while Toad mentions the loss of Man-Bull. Puma later joined Vulture and the other animal-themed characters in fighting the Hunter-Bots. When Kraven the Hunter tells Arcade to lower the forcefield, Puma and the other animal-themed characters are freed.

Powers and abilities
Puma possesses a number of superhuman attributes that are a result of a combination of genetic engineering and mysticism. Thomas Fireheart is the latest in a line of Native Americans that were specially matched and bred to produce a perfect human being. That genetic manipulation was enhanced by an unknown supernatural process through which his tribe endowed him with magical abilities.

Fireheart undergoes a physical transformation through intense concentration that includes an increase in his height and weight, his body becoming covered with a fine tan fur, and razor sharp fangs and claws.

Transformation into this form also grants Fireheart superhuman physical attributes of catlike strength, speed, intelligence, agility, durability, flexibility, reflexes/reactions, coordination, balance and endurance, like his namesake.

Puma also possesses superhumanly acute senses. His sense of touch is enhanced to the extent that he is able to feel the impressions of ink on a piece of paper. His vision and hearing are enhanced in a similar manner, enabling him to both see and hear sights and sounds that ordinary humans can't and to see and hear at much greater distances. Puma also possesses a superhumanly acute sense of smell that he uses to track a target by scent.

He is also an extraordinary hand-to-hand combatant, having received training in numerous martial arts disciplines, especially in the martial arts used by Master Muramoto. As head of Fireheart Enterprises, Puma has access to highly advanced technology as well as a personal staff of trained investigators that often provide him information on enemies and potential enemies. In his identity as Thomas Fireheart, Puma is a very wealthy, skilled and respected businessman, with a master's degree in Business Administration. He has a personal customized Lear jet for long-distance travel.

While some of Puma's activities are morally dubious, he is not truly evil and is not a criminal. His primary concerns are his own personal advancement and the welfare of his people, and he has come to Spider-Man's aid as often as he has tried to harm him.

Other versions

Earth-001
 On Earth-001 during the Spider-Verse storyline, Fireheart (a character that resembles Puma) is a member of the Hounds who are servants of Verna of the Inheritors. He accompanies Verna and the other Hounds when they head to Earth-1610 to hunt Miles Morales. He is killed by the Superior Spider-Man, and his allies Spider-Punk and Assassin Spider-Man.

Secret Wars
 During the Secret Wars storyline, a version of Puma lives in the Battleworld version of the Deadlands. He is among the zombies that attack a strike force that was assembled by Crossbones of Earth-15513 to hunt Red Skull of Earth-18191.

In other media

Television
 Puma appears in the 2017 Spider-Man television series. This version is a member of the Wild Pack who wears a special gauntlet on his left hand that extends his claws. In the episode "Take Two", he accompanies the Wild Pack in stealing the Neuro Cortex from Horizon High for an anonymous client, which leads to a fight with Spider-Man and Doctor Octopus. After their defeat, the Wild Pack are arrested by the police.

Video games
 Puma appears as a boss character in the Game Boy Advance and PC versions of the Spider-Man 2 game, voiced by Dee Bradley Baker. He and his henchmen are hired by Doctor Octopus to lure Spider-Man away from Mary Jane Watson so he can kidnap her. Puma has one of his henchmen steal Mary Jane's car, whom Spider-Man follows to a warehouse. From there, he engages Puma in a fight across the city before eventually defeating him. After revealing that Doctor Octopus kidnapped Mary Jane, Puma attempts to make his escape, but Spider-Man stops him and leaves him webbed to a crane.

References

External links
 
 SpiderFan.org profile
 Amazing Spider-Man Unofficial Fansite profile
 Samruby.com profile
 Unofficial Marvel Comics Reference HQ profile
 Puma against Spider-Man on Amazing #257

Characters created by Ron Frenz
Characters created by Tom DeFalco
Comics characters introduced in 1984
Fictional businesspeople
Fictional characters from New Mexico]
Fictional characters with superhuman durability or invulnerability
Fictional characters with superhuman senses
Fictional mercenaries in comics
Fictional Native American people
Fictional werecats
Marvel Comics characters who can move at superhuman speeds
Marvel Comics characters with superhuman strength
Marvel Comics male superheroes
Marvel Comics male supervillains
Marvel Comics mutates
Spider-Man characters